Events from the year 1836 in Spain.

Incumbents
Monarch: Isabella II
Regent: Maria Christina of the Two Sicilies
Prime Minister - 
 until 15 May - Juan Álvarez Mendizábal  
 15 May-14 August - Francisco Javier Isturiz y Montero 
 starting 14 August - José María Calatrava y Peinado

Events
January 16–18 - Battle of Arlabán
April 26 - Battle of Terapegui
September 20 - Battle of Villarrobledo
November 23 - Battle of Majaceite
December 24 - Battle of Luchana

Births
Writer: Gustavo Adolfo Bécquer

Deaths

See also
First Carlist War

 
1830s in Spain
Years of the 19th century in Spain